Piro Preman (1832–1872) was the first female Punjabi poet.

Biography

Little is known about Piro's life. She is believed to have been sold into prostitution in Heera Mandi, the red-light district of Lahore. She escaped Heera Mandi and went on to become a devotee of Gulab Das at the Gulabdasi Dera in Chathian Wala (in present-day Pakistan). Das was a Sikh Jat who founded the Gulabdasi sect. The sect was based on Hindu–Sikh asceticism, but considered themselves to be neither Hindu nor Sikh.

Most of the information about Piro comes from her own autobiographical verses, the Ik Sau Sath Kafian or the "One Hundred and Sixty Kafis (160 Kafis)", written in the mid-nineteenth century. In 160 Kafis, Piro describes a series of events in her life after she began living with Gulab Das in Chathian Wala. Piro refers to herself as a prostitute, and also a Muslim. Following her arrival in Chathian Wala, Piro writes that her "professional wardens" from Heera Mandi followed her and persuaded Gulab Das to send her back to Lahore. She ultimately agreed to return to Lahore, where she describes a confrontation with mullahs and qazis who assume that she has not only become an apostate, but also converted to the religion of her guru, thus becoming a kafir. Piro does not deny apostasy or conversion, but refuses to convert back to Islam. She abuses the mullahs and Islam, and praises the spirituality of her guru. According to historian Anshu Malhotra, "The unabashed use of language that might be considered vulgar among the respectable today, adds a colourful dimension to Piro’s speech."

Piro writes that her actions result in her being abducted, and forcibly transported from Lahore to Wazirabad. She is incarcerated at Wazirabad by a woman named  Mehrunissa. Piro describes that she was able to befriend two women, Janu and Rehmati, and utilize their help to send a message to Gulab Das. The guru sends two of his disciples, Gulab Singh and Chatar Singh, to Wazirabad. With the help of sympathizers, the disciples are able to rescue Piro and bring her back to Gulab Das' establishment in Chathian Wala.

Piro and Gulab Das shared an intimate relationship despite social and religious pressures. The two were interred together at a tomb in Chathian Wala. Although the Gulabdasis were neither Hindu nor Sikh, following the Partition of India, they were expelled from Chathian Wala by the now Muslim-majority populace in Pakistan. The sect subsequently fled to India where they settled in Haryana.

In popular culture
Piro's life has been the subject of two Indian plays - Piro Preman by Shahryar, and Shairi by Sawrajbir. Shairi was also performed by Pakistani theatre group Ajoka Theatre led by Madeeha Gauhar in Lahore and Amritsar.

References

1832 births
1872 deaths
Indian women poets
Punjabi-language poets
19th-century women writers
19th-century Indian women writers
19th-century Indian writers